Newton Road railway station was a station of the London and North Western Railway in Sandwell between West Bromwich and Great Barr, England. It lay between Hamstead and the later Tame Bridge Parkway stations on what is now known as the Chase Line.

However, this move yielded few dividends in passenger numbers, so the station was shifted back near its original position on Newton Road in 1902, where it stayed until final closure in 1945.

Incidents 

On 2 September 1848 a LNWR express train, comprising a locomotive, tender, luggage van and three passenger carriages, from Stratford to Birmingham departed from Wolverhampton 25 minutes behind schedule. Passengers noticed unusual osculations, and those in the rear carriage, which belonged to the Scottish Central Railway, reported a series of bangs, after which the train derailed, coming to rest about a quarter of a mile past Newton Road station. A light engine travelling in the other direction - and with Francis Trevithick aboard - struck the wreckage and was also derailed. At least one passenger died as a result of the initial derailment.

References

External links
Rail Around Birmingham and the West Midlands: Newton Road

Railway stations in Great Britain opened in 1837
Railway stations in Great Britain closed in 1945
Disused railway stations in Sandwell
Grand Junction Railway
Former London and North Western Railway stations